Mesalina ayunensis, also known as the Ayun sand lizard or Arnold's sand lizard, is a species of sand-dwelling lizard in the family Lacertidae. It is endemic to Oman.

References

ayunensis
Reptiles described in 1980
Taxa named by Edwin Nicholas Arnold